Mạc Toàn (chữ Hán: 莫全; ?–1593) emperor Vũ An đế was the sixth emperor of the Mạc dynasty, and effectively the last of the dynasty. He reigned briefly from 1592–1593, following the death of Mạc Mậu Hợp and was followed by various nominal leaders of the Mạc: Mạc Kính Chỉ (1592–1593), Mạc Kính Cung (1593–1594), Mạc Kính Khoan (1594–1628) and Mạc Kính Vũ (1628–1677).

References

 Đại Việt Thông Sử, Lê Quý Đôn (1759)

1593 deaths
Mạc dynasty emperors
Year of birth unknown
Vietnamese monarchs